Majken Thorup Toft (born 1 May 1979) is a Danish former swimmer who won a bronze medal in the 50 m breaststroke at the 2004 European Aquatics Championships. The same year she competed in three events at the 2004 Summer Olympics, but was eliminated in the preliminaries. She retired from swimming in 2005 due to pericarditis that resulted in her hospitalization earlier that year. During her career she set 27 national records.

References

1979 births
Danish female breaststroke swimmers
Swimmers at the 2004 Summer Olympics
Olympic swimmers of Denmark
Living people
European Aquatics Championships medalists in swimming
People from Hadsund
Sportspeople from the North Jutland Region